Ernst Wilhelm Eschmann (pseud. Leopold Dingräve, Von Severus, 1904 - 1987) was a German writer, sociologist and playwright.

Bibliography

Some works
 (1930) Der faschistische Staat in Italien
 (1933) Vom Sinn der Revolution
 (1934) Die Aussenpolitik des Faschismus
 (1936) Griechisches Tagebuch
 (1961) Im Amerika der Griechen
 (1970) Tessiner Episteln

Dramas
 (1939) Ariadne
 (1950) Alkestis

1904 births
1987 deaths
Academic staff of the University of Münster
German male writers